The Dongshih Hakka Cultural Park is a Hakka cultural center in Dongshi District, Taichung, Taiwan.

History

The idea of the establishment of the center was originated from Dongshih Jhuang Cultural Association. The building was renovated from the waiting area of the former Dongshih train station, constructed during the Japanese rule to connect Dongshi with sugarcane trading areas. The platform and old facilities of the train station were removed during the renovation but the passengers waiting benches were kept.

Architecture
The building was constructed with Hakka architectural style.

Exhibitions
The center displays cultural heritage and arts exhibition of Hakka culture.

See also
 List of tourist attractions in Taiwan

References

Cultural centers in Taichung
Defunct railway stations in Taiwan
Hakka culture in Taiwan